The Nigerian two hundred-naira bill (₦200) is a denomination of Nigerian currency. The first Nigerian note with this value was issued in November 2000.

Sardauna of Sokoto Ahmadu Bello has been featured on the obverse of the bill since 2000. On the reverse of the banknote is a pyramid of agricultural commodity, livestock farming, the National Coat of Arms, yellow trumpet flowers, and the denomination.
The bills are also commonly referred to as 20 faiba, indicating that it is ₦10 in 20 places.

Redesign
On the 23rd of October 2022, the governor of the Central Bank of Nigeria, Godwin Emefiele announced that the ₦200, ₦500, and ₦1000 notes would be redesigned to reduce counterfeiting and corruption. The new notes were unveiled on the 23rd of November 2022. No changes were made on the existing features, only the overall colour of the note was changed.President Muhammad Buhari said that the old 200 notes can be used till 10th April 2023

References

Two-hundred-base-unit banknotes
Banknotes